Y Borth may refer to:
 Borth - a village in north Ceredigion.
 Menai Bridge - a town on Anglesey whose Welsh name Porthaethwy is very commonly abbreviated to Y Borth as in Ffair Y Borth.